Høietun is a neighbourhood in the north of Kristiansand, Norway. It is a part of the Grim borough at Mosby. The neighborhood is a part of the Vennesla suburbs.

See also
Mosby
Vennesla

References

Kristiansand region